Shalom Harlow (born December 5, 1973) is a Canadian model and actress. She began working as a fashion model in the early 1990s, achieving supermodel status by the end of the decade. In 2007, she was listed by Forbes as thirteenth in the list of the World's 15 Top-Earning Supermodels. She hosted MTV's House of Style alongside fellow model Amber Valletta. She has also appeared in films such as In & Out (1997) and How to Lose a Guy in 10 Days (2003).

Early life and family
Harlow was born in Oshawa, Ontario, the daughter of Sandi Herbert and David Harlow. Her mother named her Shalom, meaning "peace", used as a standard greeting in Hebrew. Her father held several jobs as a social worker, real estate agent, and financial investor, while her mother, Sandi Herbert, worked with developmentally disabled adults. She grew up in a "hippie community just outside Toronto", and the family often spent time at their family cottage, built by her great-great grandfather. She has two younger brothers, Chris and Nathan.

Early on, Harlow took up ballet, which she later decided was not for her, as she claimed in a 2008 New York Times article, "My rebellious nature always comes out." She instead became interested in tap dancing, as she enjoyed the noise it created.

Harlow contracted Lyme disease and black mould poisoning from a former home, and experienced C-PTSD as a result of the illnesses.

Career

Harlow was discovered at a Cure concert in Toronto and started modeling straight out of high school. She appeared on numerous magazine covers, editorials, in top runway shows, and in movies; she co-hosted MTV's House of Style with fellow supermodel Amber Valletta. She was the long-time favorite model for many designers who found that her look worked well in both commercial and couture campaigns. She was the first winner of Vogue/VH1's Model of the Year Award, in 1995. Harlow is the spokesperson for Chanel's Coco fragrance.

In July 2007, she earned an estimated total of $2 million over the previous 12 months, with Forbes naming her thirteenth in the list of the World's 15 Top-Earning Supermodels.
She has appeared on the covers of magazines such as Vogue, Elle, Harper's Bazaar, Marie Claire, W, V, Cosmopolitan, and Allure.
Harlow has walked the runways for Prada, Chanel, Christian Dior, Dolce & Gabbana, John Galliano, Anna Sui, Moschino, Gianfranco Ferré, Fendi, Karl Lagerfeld, Versace, Calvin Klein, Givenchy, Balmain, Max Mara, Chloé, Blumarine, Isaac Mizrahi, Hermés, Valentino, Dries Van Noten, Yves Saint Laurent, Alberta Ferretti, Gucci, Jil Sander, Celine, Marc Jacobs, Salvatore Ferragamo, Alexander McQueen, Louis Vuitton, Zac Posen, Jean Paul Gaultier, Giles Deacon, Stella McCartney, Alexander Wang, Michael Kors, and Viktor & Rolf. 
She has appeared in advertising campaigns for Yves Saint Laurent, Dior, Alberta Ferretti, Chanel, Dolce & Gabbana, Max Mara, DKNY, Ralph Lauren, Anne Klein, Versace, Jil Sander, Ann Taylor, Chloé, Isaac Mizrahi, Blumarine, Max Azria, Giorgio Armani, Nautica, Valentino, Nars, Jil Sander, Lancôme, Perry Ellis, Saks Fifth Avenue, Banana Republic, Gap, and L'Oréal.

In September 2018, she returned to the runway at Milan Fashion Week for the Versace show.

Filmography
In & Out (1997), Sonya
Cherry (1999), Leila Sweet
Head Over Heels (2001), Jade
Vanilla Sky (2001), Colleen
The Salton Sea (2002), Nancy
Happy Here and Now (2002), Muriel
How to Lose a Guy in 10 Days (2003), Judy Green
I Love Your Work (2003), Charlotte
Melinda and Melinda (2004), Joan
Game 6 (2005), Paisly Porter
The Last Romantic (2006), Christy Tipilton

Television
House of Style (1996–1997), Co-host
When I Was a Girl (2001)
The Jury (2004), Melissa Greenfield

Print
1998 Pirelli Calendar, June

References

External links

Shalom Harlow @ AskMen.com

1973 births
Living people
20th-century Canadian actresses
21st-century Canadian actresses
Actresses from Oshawa
Female models from Ontario
Canadian film actresses
Canadian television actresses
IMG Models models